The February 2006 Masters of Curling men's Grand Slam curling tournament was held February 23 to 26, 2006 at the Mile One Centre in St. John's, Newfoundland and Labrador.

The total purse for the event was $100,000. The tournament format was a triple knock out with an 8 team playoff. 

Randy Ferbey and his team of David Nedohin, Scott Pfeifer and Marcel Rocque of Edmonton defeated their same-city rivals Team Kevin Martin in the final to pick up the top prize of $30,000. It was Ferbey's first Slam win. Ferbey won the game 6–3. Martin blamed his team's loss as having too many of his rocks pick. Ferbey defeated Glenn Howard 9–6 and Martin defeated Shawn Adams 8–5 in the semifinals. In the quarterfinals, Ferbey beat Vic Peters 9–3 and Martin beat Wayne Middaugh 5–3. 

Sportsnet carried the semifinals and finals on television.

The event was overshadowed by the final of curling event at the 2006 Winter Olympics, which was held on the same weekend, and featured the hometown Brad Gushue rink. That, and a snow storm in St. John's, kept many would-be spectators at home.

Teams
The teams were as follows:

Prize money

Final

References

External links
Event site

2006 in Canadian curling
Curling in Newfoundland and Labrador
2006-02
2006 in Newfoundland and Labrador
February 2006 sports events in Canada
Sport in St. John's, Newfoundland and Labrador